Th Minister of Rural and Regional Development has been Ahmad Zahid Hamidi since 3 December 2022. The minister is supported by Deputy Minister of Rural and Regional Development. The minister administers the portfolio through the Ministry of Rural and Regional Development.

List of ministers of rural development
The following individuals have been appointed as Minister of Rural Development, or any of its precedent titles:

Political Party:

List of ministers of regional development
The following individuals have been appointed as Minister of Regional Development, or any of its precedent titles:

Political Party:

References

Ministry of Rural Development (Malaysia)
Lists of government ministers of Malaysia
Malaysia